Trochila is a genus of fungi in the family Dermateaceae. It was circumscribed by Elias Magnus Fries in 1849. The genus contains 15 species.

Species
Trochila astragali
Trochila chilensis
Trochila craterium
Trochila ilicina
Trochila jaffueli
Trochila laurocerasi
Trochila leopoldina
Trochila majalis
Trochila perseae
Trochila phacidioides
Trochila staritziana
Trochila tami
Trochila tetraspora
Trochila verrucosa

See also
 List of Dermateaceae genera

References

Dermateaceae genera
Dermateaceae